Orceolina is a genus of lichenized fungi in the family Trapeliaceae.

References

Baeomycetales
Lichen genera
Baeomycetales genera
Taxa described in 1970
Taxa named by Hannes Hertel